This is a list of radio stations in the Mexican state of Durango, which can be sorted by their call signs, frequencies, location, ownership, names, and programming formats.

See also 
 List of radio stations in Coahuila for stations on the Coahuila side of the Comarca Lagunera

Notes

References 

Durango
Durango